The Calabouço River is a river of Paraíba and Rio Grande do Norte states in eastern Brazil.

See also
List of rivers of Rio Grande do Norte
List of rivers of Paraíba

References
Brazilian Ministry of Transport

Rivers of Paraíba
Rivers of Rio Grande do Norte